Bedford Autodrome is an autodrome based on the former site of RAE Bedford, in the village of Thurleigh, Bedfordshire. It is owned by former Formula One driver Jonathan Palmer's MotorSport Vision organisation.

The autodrome
It is built on the northern section of the former site of the Royal Aerospace Establishment, Bedford airbase and took five years to convert to a track using the latest in track laying techniques to provide a quiet and smooth surface.

It was designed to be driven by high performance road cars and as such has larger than usual run off areas and does not have sections of Armco safety barriers which would potentially damage a car seriously if it left the track. Because the track has no Armco it is not eligible to hold races there or have an area for spectators due to the inability to ensure their safety.

Thurleigh Museum
Thurleigh Museum is a small museum located within the Bedford Autodrome complex. The museum itself is housed in one of the few remaining buildings on the original airfield, now Bedford Aerodrome, built during World War II. The museum is primarily concerned with World War II and the history of the airfield rather than the village. A collection of artifacts has been assembled to re-create the activities and atmosphere of the airfield and surrounding area during the war years. The museum is supported and funded by the 306th Bombardment Group.

2012 Olympics and Paralympics
Bedford Autodrome was used as an official training site for the 2012 Summer Olympics and Paralympics.

Vehicle storage as part of the UK Scrappage Scheme 
Sections of the main and secondary runways at the aerodrome are currently utilised for vehicle storage in relation to the UK Vehicle scrappage scheme. A petition to the UK Government requesting allowance for recommissioning and resale of classic vehicles from this stockpile was submitted in March 2006, but ultimately rejected.

Appearances in video games
In rFactor, the track is one of the tracks available for download to be added into the game.
The many configurations of the track are also available to be driven on in TOCA Race Driver 3.

References

External links 
 Bedford Autodrome
 Thurleigh Museum
 rFactor Bedford Autodrome Track

Motorsport venues in England
Sports venues in Bedfordshire